Coprosma propinqua is a New Zealand plant of the genus Coprosma in the family Rubiaceae. Its Māori name (in common New Zealand usage) is mingimingi, a name which is also applied to closely related species such as C. dumosa, C. rhamnoides, C. virescens and C. crassifolia. It is a small-leaved shrub or tree which grows 3 to 6 metres high. 
It has divaricating branches, and is common in swampy forest, in scrub, along stream banks and in stony places. It has a wide distribution, ranging from Mangonui in the North Island as far south as Stewart Island. It grows from sea level to 460 metres.

The male flowers occur in axillary clusters of one to four on very short branches. Female flowers are found on their own at the ends of short branchlets.

The fruit is a drupe, pale when immature, turning dark blue or blue-flecked when mature.

Coprosma propinqua freely hybridizes with C. robusta (karamu).

References

propinqua
Endemic flora of New Zealand
Divaricating plants
Taxa named by Allan Cunningham (botanist)